Andrzej Bachleda may refer to:

 Andrzej Bachleda (born 1947), Polish former alpine skier
 Andrzej Bachleda (born 1975), Polish former alpine skier